Chess 7.0 is a 1982 video game published by Odesta.

Gameplay
Chess 7.0 is a chess game with 17 different levels of skill, and includes 27 special features.

Reception
David Long reviewed the game for Computer Gaming World, and stated that "Odesta's Chess 7.0 probably has the most powerful chess solitaire play capability now available for home computers. You will find it extremely entertaining even if chess is not your favorite game. I hope that more designers will try to reach this level of solitaire capability in other types of computer games."

References

External links
Addison Wesley Book of Atari Software 1984
Review in Creative Computing
Review in Softalk
Review in Commodore Microcomputers
Article in TPUG Magazine
Review in Hi-Res
Review in Washington Apple Pi
Entry in "Things To Do With Your Atari Computer"
Article in Ahoy!

1982 video games
Apple II games
Atari 8-bit family games
Chess software
DOS games
Video games developed in the United States